Mexico competed at the 2011 World Championships in Athletics from August 27 to September 4 in Daegu, South Korea.
A team of 10 athletes was
announced to represent the country
in the event.  The team was led by race walker Eder Sánchez, bronze
medalist at the last world championships.

Results

Men

Women

References

External links
Official local organising committee website
Official IAAF competition website

Nations at the 2011 World Championships in Athletics
World Championships in Athletics
Mexico at the World Championships in Athletics